Washington Arubi (born 29 August 1985) is a Zimbabwean professional footballer who plays as a goalkeeper for Premier Soccer League  side Tshakhuma Tsha Madzivhandila.

Career

Club
He started his career with Lancashire Steel for which he played 29 matches, before having spells with other Zimbabwean clubs Highlanders, Bantu Rovers and Dynamos. In 2012, Arubi joined South African Premier Division team University of Pretoria. He made 105 appearances in the league for Tuks before leaving in 2016. In February 2017, Arubi joined National First Division side Stellenbosch.

Arubi signed for SuperSport United on a free transfer in summer 2018.

He joined Tshakhuma Tsha Madzivhandila on a two-year contract in October 2020, where he was named vice-captain.

International
In 2007, he defended the Zimbabwe national football team during the COSAFA Cup. He participated in the qualification matches for the Africa Cup of Nations 2015.

Career statistics

Club
.

Honours

Club
Dynamos
Zimbabwe Premier Soccer League (1): 2011
Cup of Zimbabwe (1): 2011

References

External links
 
 

Living people
1985 births
Zimbabwean footballers
Zimbabwe international footballers
2011 African Nations Championship players
Zimbabwe Premier Soccer League players
South African Premier Division players
National First Division players
Lancashire Steel F.C. players
Highlanders F.C. players
Bantu Tshintsha Guluva Rovers F.C. players
Dynamos F.C. players
University of Pretoria F.C. players
Stellenbosch F.C. players
SuperSport United F.C. players
Tshakhuma Tsha Madzivhandila F.C. players
People from Norton, Zimbabwe
Association football goalkeepers
Zimbabwe A' international footballers